Wilkowiczki  (German Klein Wilkowitz) is a village in the administrative district of Gmina Toszek, within Gliwice County, Silesian Voivodeship, in southern Poland.

The village has a population of 239.

References

Wilkowiczki